Telshe Yeshiva (also spelled Telz) is a yeshiva in Wickliffe, Ohio, formerly located in Telšiai, Lithuania. During World War II the yeshiva began relocating to Wickliffe, Ohio, in the United States and is now known as the Rabbinical College of Telshe, commonly referred to as Telz Yeshiva, or Telz in short.

It is a prominent Haredi institution of Torah study, with additional branches in Chicago and New York. It is the successor of the New Haven Yeshiva of Cleveland.

History

In 1875 it was founded in the town of Telshi in Kovno Governorate of the Russian Empire. By 1900 it was "one of the three largest yeshivot in Imperial Russia."

The yeshiva was established by three Orthodox rabbis and Talmudists:
 Meir Atlas, later the rabbi of Shavli) and the father-in-law of Elchonon Wasserman and Chaim Ozer Grodzensky; 
 Zvi Yaakov Oppenheim, who later became the rabbi of Kelm; and 
 Shlomo Zalman Abel, the brother-in-law of Shimon Shkop.

Rabbi Eliezer Gordon

In 1883, Eliezer Gordon was appointed as the chief rabbi of the town of Telz and in 1884, rosh yeshiva (dean) of the yeshiva.  A student of Yisrael Salanter, he had been a maggid shiur (lecturer) in Salanter's yeshiva. and a rabbi in Kelm, and for a brief time in Slabodka (a suburb of Kaunas/Kovno). The yeshiva eventually became one of the largest in Imperial Russia. Gordon added his son-in-law, Yosef Leib Bloch, to the faculty and in 1885 he hired Shimon Shkop.

In 1894 the yeshiva moved from its Telz community-provided building into a new facility. That year it added a new subject of study, mussar (Jewish ethics). Ben Zion Kranitz was hired for a new faculty position: mussar mashgiach (teacher of ethics). In 1897 Gordon hired Leib Chasman, who instituted a very strict mussar regime in the yeshiva which many students opposed.

In 1902, Shkop left to become the rabbi of Breinsk, Lithuania. In 1905 Chaim Rabinowitz joined the yeshiva.

In 1910, while fundraising for the yeshiva in London, Gordon died of a heart attack.

Rabbi Yosef Leib Bloch
Gordon's son-in-law Yosef Leib Bloch became the community's rabbi and the rosh yeshiva. In 1920, he established primary schools in Telz for boys and girls, and also added a mechina ("preparatory school") to the yeshiva.

Parallel to an easier version of the yeshiva curriculum, the mechina also featured secular studies, another innovation at the time. In 1924 the Lithuanian government announced its decision to accredit only those rabbinical colleges that possessed a secular studies department. The Rabbinical College of Telshe was the only such institute, although secular studies were only in its mechina.

A kollel (postgraduate institute) opened in 1922, to train graduates for the rabbinate. Bloch's son-in-law Chaim Mordechai Katz was dean (rosh hakollel).

Yavneh
In 1918, a teachers training institute was opened in Kovno but did not achieve much success. In 1925 The Yavneh School for the Training of Teachers reopened in Telz under the auspices of The Rabbinical College of Telshe. This served as a postgraduate institute, with the charter of producing teachers for Jewish schools. The curriculum at the teacher's institute included educational skills, Hebrew Bible, Talmud, the Hebrew language and literature and mathematics.

For many years the Jewish community in Lithuania had lacked a structured educational system for teenage girls. In 1927 a high school department for girls was established in Telshe.

In 1930, a sister institute to The Yavneh Teacher's Training Institute was opened by Rabbi Joseph Leib Bloch of Telz. The school offered a two-year course to young women.

These various schools were all incorporated as a part of The Rabbinical College of Telshe.

In October 1930 Yosef Leib Bloch died and his second oldest son, Avraham Yitzchak Bloch succeeded him as both community rabbi and rosh yeshiva.

Rabbi Avraham Yitzchak Bloch
.
In the 1930s older students in the yeshiva were selected to teach for periods of time at new schools in small towns where there had previously been little or no structured schooling, and then return to continue their studies at the yeshiva.

Rabinowitz died the year Yosef Leib Bloch and his son Azriel Rabinowitz, was appointed as a rosh yeshiva.

In 1933, the yeshiva built a new building to house the mechina ("preparatory school").

The Holocaust
In the Fall of 1939, the Russians were allowed to bring troops into Lithuania on the pretext of defending the country.  In June 1940, the Russians seized control of the country and quickly transformed it into a "soviet socialist republic."  As part of this transformation, private Jewish organizations and schools were disbanded and the yeshiva was closed. Most of the students dispersed, with only about a hundred students remaining in Telshe. The learning was done in groups of 20-25 students, studying in various batai medrashim ("small synagogues") led by the rosh yeshivas.

During the early years of World War II, Rabbi Elya Meir Bloch and Rabbi Chaim Mordechai Katz were in the United States on a fund-raising mission. As the war broke out, their only option to ensure the continuity of the Yeshiva was to transfer the whole yeshiva to American soil.

In October 1940, a group of students led by Rabbi Chaim Stein escaped from war-ravaged Lithuania as it was overrun by the Nazis. This daring flight took place on the Sabbath. While travel is ordinarily prohibited on the Sabbath, one must transgress this prohibition in order to save lives and escape great peril. The original faculty, their families and most of the student body who chose to be left behind in Europe, were killed in Lithuania by Nazi forces and Lithuanian collaborators.

Escaping to Russia as the war ravaged Eastern Europe, another war was taking place in the Pacific - the very direction that the students led by Rabbi Chaim Stein were headed. The students achieved safe passage via the Trans-Siberian Railroad to the Far East. The group had somehow acquired visas from the renowned Chiune Sugihara, and became beneficiaries of his admirable action to risk his life to enable people from war-torn Europe to seek refuge elsewhere in the world.

Shortly after, the students traveled to Australia. Since some of the students were British subjects in possession of British passports, such as Rabbi Shlomo Davis, their visas were granted.

Upon arrival in Australia, they were greeted by the small but vibrant Jewish community in Brisbane. As they planned out their next course of action, the group of students reached out to improve the Jewish quality of life in the local Jewish community. Among this group was Rabbi Chaim Stein, who later became Rosh Yeshiva in Wickliffe, Ohio, Rabbi Shlomo Davis who became a teacher and later a senior administrator for the students registrar (retired and living in Lakewood, New Jersey), and Rabbi Nosson Meir Wachtfogel, who later became mashgiach ruchani of Beth Medrash Gevoha in Lakewood, New Jersey. The local Jewish community, afraid that these scholars would cause a flourishing of orthodoxy, paid for their transit to the US.

This group found their way to the United States in early 1941. Once reunited with their Roshei Yeshiva, Rabbi Elya Meir Bloch and Rabbi Chaim Mordechai Katz, they eventually settled in Cleveland, Ohio.

Telshe in the United States
The yeshiva was opened in Cleveland in the house of Yitzchak & Sarah Feigenbaum on November 10, 1941. As of 1954, it became officially titled the Rabbinical College of Telshe. They relocated to the present Wickliffe location in 1957.

Telshe consists of a high school, college and post-graduate school. The yeshiva is a non-profit and is accredited through the Association of Advanced Rabbinical and Talmudic Schools. The yeshiva has a department of secular studies that grants a high school diploma.

In the United States, the yeshiva was initially led by a faculty including the late Rabbis Elya Meir Bloch, Chaim Mordechai Katz, Boruch Sorotzkin, Mordechai Gifter, Chaim Stein, Aizik Ausband, and Pesach Stein.

The 2013 student count of 130 included 80 in grades 9-12; the highest student count, in 1966, was about 425.

Notable alumni
Among the well-known alumni of the yeshiva are:
 Rabbi Chaim Yitzchak Hacohen Bloch, Chief rabbi of Bausk and Plunge
 Rabbi Noson Ordman, Rosh Yeshiva Etz Chaim Yeshiva (London)
 Ezriel Carlebach (1909–1956), Israeli journalist and editorial writer
 Rabbi Naftoli Carlebach, Orthodox Jewish rabbi and accountant
 Rabbi Nachum Zev Dessler, Cleveland, Ohio
 Rabbi Azriel Goldfein, founding Rosh Yeshiva of Yeshivah Gedolah of Johannesburg
 Rabbi Chaim Gutnick, Melbourne Australia
 Rabbi Chaim Dov Keller, Chicago, Illinois. Rosh Yeshiva of Telshe Chicago
 Rabbi Zev Leff, Moshav Mattityahu, Israel
 Rabbi Moshe Leib Rabinovich
 Rabbi Dov Yehuda Schochet, Toronto Canada Former Rabbi in Basel Switzerland and former Chief Rabbi of The Hauge Netherlands. Rabbi Schochet was part of a secret society made up of Telz Alumni seeking to keep rabbinic standards throughout the world, and to that effect with great self sacrifice he lived in war torn Europe even after the mass migration to the USA, Israel etc. Many considered him to be a natural choice to join the Telz yeshiva Cleveland leadership, but due to internal "politics" he was not given the position. Rav Schochet settled in Toronto Canada with his wife and ten children, and quickly established himself as a leading force of Judaism in the rabbinic world and as well as a much beloved teacher whose attention to each student was legendary. Following a miraculous story with the Lubavitcher Rebbe, Rabbi Menachem Mendel Schneerson, and studying the Rebbes hashkafa, Rav Schochet became a complete follower of Schneerson in Mind, Body and Spirit.
Rabbi Avraham Tanzer, Rosh Yeshiva at Yeshiva College of South Africa

Branches
 Telshe Chicago. In 1960, the yeshiva opened a branch in Chicago, Illinois. Within 10 years the branch in Chicago became independent of the yeshiva in Cleveland and no longer has an official formal connection to the yeshiva in Cleveland, although informal ties remain close.
 Kiryat Ye'arim (Telz-Stone), Israel. In 1977 Rabbi Mordechai Gifter brought a group of 20 students from Cleveland to open a branch of the yeshiva in Kiryat Ye'arim (Telz-Stone), Israel. Classes took place in several apartments. In 1979, when Rabbi Baruch Sorotzkin died, Rabbi Gifter was asked to return to Cleveland and the Israeli branch closed.
 Yeshiva of Telshe Alumni. In the early 1980s, Rabbi Avraham Ausband, a grandson of the Telzer Rov Rabbi Avraham Yitzchak Bloch, was sent to open up the Yeshiva of Telshe Alumni in Riverdale, New York by his Rebbe, Rabbi Mordechai Gifter.
 Birchas Chaim. In 2001 Rabbi Chaim Stein's son, Rabbi Shmuel Zalman Stein, opened Yeshivah Birchas Chaim in Lakewood, NJ.

Gallery

See also 
 Holocaust in Telšiai

References

External links
 An explanation and synopsis of the Telzer Derech
 Catalog of historic items from Telshe Yeshiva in Ohio
 "An Analysis of Darchei HaLimud (Methodologies of Talmud Study) Centering on a Cup of Tea"
 History of the town of Telsiai (shtetlinks)
 The Ohel Tomb of Reb Eliezer Gordon in Edmonton Beis Olam London with photos of the Matzeivo

Education in Cleveland
Educational institutions established in 1875
Haredi Judaism in the United States
Haredi yeshivas
High schools in Lake County, Ohio
Lithuanian-American culture in Ohio
Lithuanian-Jewish culture in the United States
Rabbinical College of Telshe
Orthodox yeshivas in the United States
Telšiai
Jews and Judaism in Telšiai
Seminaries and theological colleges in Ohio
Yeshivas of Lithuania
Private high schools in Ohio
The Holocaust in Lithuania
Pre-World War II European yeshivas
Haredi Judaism in Lithuania
1875 establishments in the Russian Empire